Aicha Sayah is a Moroccan karateka. She represented Morocco at the 2019 African Games held in Rabat, Morocco and she won the gold medal in the women's kumite 50 kg event. She also won the gold medal in the women's team kumite event.

In 2018, she won the silver medal in the women's kumite 50 kg event at the Mediterranean Games held in Tarragona, Spain. In the final, she lost against Jelena Milivojčević of Serbia. She won the gold medal in her event at the 2019 African Karate Championships held in Gaborone, Botswana.

In 2021, she competed at the World Olympic Qualification Tournament held in Paris, France hoping to qualify for the 2020 Summer Olympics in Tokyo, Japan.

Achievements

References 

Living people
Year of birth missing (living people)
Place of birth missing (living people)
Moroccan female karateka
Competitors at the 2018 Mediterranean Games
Mediterranean Games silver medalists for Morocco
Mediterranean Games medalists in karate
African Games medalists in karate
African Games gold medalists for Morocco
Competitors at the 2019 African Games
21st-century Moroccan women